The BAIC BJ90 or Beijing BJ90 is a full-size luxury SUV produced from 2016. It is based on the second generation Mercedes-Benz GL-Class which has been renamed to GLS-Class as of the 2016 facelift.

Due to the Beijing-Benz joint venture Beijing Auto and Daimler Mercedes-Benz has, and Daimler owns a 12% stake in BAIC Motor, the parent company of the Beijing Automobiles brand, BAIC was able to acquire the specs of the Mercedes-Benz SUV as the foundation for the BJ90.

The SUV retails at around 988,000 yuan (US$141,870).

History

1st Generation (2016-2020)
Originally seen in 2015, the BJ90 debuted at an event in Beijing in August 2017  and later went on sale in 2018.

Offered in five trim levels, the BJ90 is currently priced from 710,800 yuan to 998,000 yuan (US$101,600 to US$142,780 - July 2020 exchange rate).

Compared to the GL-Class, the BJ90 is  taller,  wider and  longer.

Transmission is the Mercedes-sourced seven-speed automatic gearbox sending power to all four wheels via the Mercedes-Benz 4Matic four-wheel-drive system. Its accessories are also sources from Mercedes.

Facelift 
The BJ90 was made available from 2020 onwards with a 9G-Tronic option. This version is known as the BJ90 Shanhe Edition, a cheaper version of the BJ90 that's sold with black color only.

Sales
In 2019, 258 BJ90s were sold. 267 BJ90s were sold in 2020 and 1,563 BJ90s were sold in 2021.

References

External links
 

BAIC Group vehicles
Flagship vehicles
Cars introduced in 2016
2020s cars
Full-size sport utility vehicles
Luxury sport utility vehicles
All-wheel-drive vehicles